Hybrid is a 2007 television film by Syfy. It is the 10th film in the Maneater Series.

Plot

Cast
 Justine Bateman as Andrea
 Tinsel Korey as Lydia		
 Gordon Tootoosis as Grandpa
 Brandon Jay McLaren as Ashmore
 Cory Monteith as Aaron Scates
 Khushal Katira
 Aaron Hughes as Wilcox
 Tim Kiriluk		
 Taj Moryl		
 Wayne Nicklas		
 Susanna Portnoy		
 Craig Skene		
 Sean Skene		
 Brett Sorensen as Deaver
 Gordon Tanner as Phelps
 Richard Dean Thomas		
 Robert Borges
 Will Woytowich as Mobley

Critical reception

Further reading
 The Werewolf Filmography: 300+ Movies 
 Indie Horrors! The Not-To-Be-Missed, The Acceptable, and The Forgettable

References

External links

Syfy original films
2007 television films
2007 films
Maneater (film series)
Television about werewolves
2000s American films